Colorless green ideas sleep furiously was composed by Noam Chomsky in his 1957 book Syntactic Structures as an example of a sentence that is grammatically well-formed, but semantically nonsensical. The sentence was originally used in his 1955 thesis The Logical Structure of Linguistic Theory and in his 1956 paper "Three Models for the Description of Language". There is no obvious understandable meaning that can be derived from it, which demonstrates the distinction between syntax and semantics, and the idea that a syntactically well-formed sentence is not guaranteed to be semantically well-formed as well. As an example of a category mistake, it was used to show the inadequacy of certain probabilistic models of grammar, and the need for more structured models.

Senseless but grammatical
Chomsky writes in his 1957 book Syntactic Structures: It is fair to assume that neither sentence (1) nor (2) (nor indeed any part of these sentences) has ever occurred in an English discourse. Hence, in any statistical model that accounts for grammaticality, these sentences will be ruled out on identical grounds as equally "remote" from English. Yet (1), though nonsensical, is grammatical, while (2) is not grammatical.

Colorless green ideas – which functions as the subject of the sentence – is an anomalous string for at least two reasons:

 The adjective colorless can be understood as dull, uninteresting, or lacking in color, and so when it combines with the adjective green, this is nonsensical: an object cannot simultaneously lack color and have the color of green.
 In the phrase, colorless green ideas the abstract noun idea is described as being  colorless and green. However, due to its abstract nature, an idea cannot have or lack color.

Sleep furiously – which functions as the predicate of the sentence – is structurally well-formed; in other words, it is grammatical. However the meaning that it expresses is peculiar, as the activity of sleeping is not generally taken to be something that can be done in a furious fashion. Nevertheless, sleep furiously is both grammatical and interpretable, though its interpretation is unusual.

Combining Colorless green ideas with sleep furiously creates a sentence that some believe to be nonsensical. On the one hand, an abstract noun like idea is taken to not have the ability to engage in an activity like sleeping. On the other hand, some think it possible for an idea to sleep.

Linguists account for the unusual nature of this sentence by distinguishing two types of selection: semantic selection (s-selection) and categorical selection (c-selection). Relative to s-selection, the sentence is semantically anomalous – senseless – for three reasons:

 The s-selection of the adjective colorless is violated because it can only describe objects that lack color.
 The s-selection of the adverb furiously is violated because it can only describe activity that is compatible with angry action, and such meanings are generally incompatible with the activity of sleeping.
 The s-selection of the verb sleep is violated because it can occur only with subjects that can engage in sleep.

However, relative to c-selection, the sentence is structurally well-formed:

 The c-selection of the adverb furiously is satisfied, as it combines with the verb sleep, satisfying the requirement that an adverb modifies a verb.
 The c-selection of the adjectives colorless and green are satisfied as they combine with noun idea, satisfying the requirement that an adjective modifies a noun.
 The c-selection of the intransitive verb sleep is satisfied as it combines with the subject colorless green ideas, satisfying the requirement that an intransitive verb combines with a subject.

This leads to the conclusion that although meaningless, the structural integrity of this sentence is high.

Attempts at meaningful interpretations

Polysemy
The mechanism of polysemy – where a word has multiple meanings – can be used to create an interpretation for an otherwise non-sensical sentence. For example, the adjectives green and colorless both have figurative meanings. Green has a wide range of figurative meanings, including "immature", "pertaining to environmental consciousness", "newly formed", and "naive". And colorless can be interpreted as "nondescript". Likewise the verb sleep can have the figurative meaning of "being in dormant state", and the adverb furiously can have the figurative meaning "to do an action violently or quickly".

 figurative meaning of colorless: nondescript
 figurative meanings of green: (i) immature; (ii) pertaining to environmental consciousness; (iii) newly formed; (iv) naive
 figurative meaning of sleep: be in a dormant mental state
 figurative meaning of furiously: to do an action quickly, vigorously, intensely, energetically or violently

When these figurative meanings are taken into account the sentence Colorless green ideas sleep furiously can have legitimate meaning, with less oblique semantics, and so is compatible with the following interpretations:

 Colorless green ideas sleep furiously.= "Nondescript immature ideas have violent nightmares."
 Colorless green ideas sleep furiously.= "Naive ideas which have not yet attained their full scope can cause a mind to race even while it attempts to rest"

In popular culture
Chomsky's "colorless green" inspired written works, which all try to create meaning from the semantically meaningless utterance through added context. In 1958, linguist and anthropologist Dell Hymes presented his work to show that nonsense words can develop into something meaningful when in the right sequence.

Russian-American linguist and literary theorist Roman Jakobson (1959) interpreted "colorless green" as a pale green, and "sleep furiously" as the wildness of "a state-like sleep, as that of inertness, torpidity, numbness." Jakobson gave the example that if "[someone's] hatred never slept, why then, cannot someone's ideas fall into sleep?" John Hollander, an American poet and literary critic, argued that the sentence operates in a vacuum as it is without context. He went on to write a poem based on that idea, entitled Coiled Alizarine that was included in his book, The Night Mirror (1971).

Years later, Hollander contacted Chomsky about whether the color choice of 'green' was intentional, however Chomsky denied any intentions or influences, especially the hypothesized influence from Andrew Marvell's lines from "The Garden" (1681). 

One of the first writers to have attempted to provide the sentence meaning through context is Chinese linguist Yuen Ren Chao (1997). Chao's poem, entitled Making Sense Out of Nonsense: The Story of My Friend Whose "Colorless Green Ideas Sleep Furiously" (after Noam Chomsky) was published in 1971. This poem attempts to explain what "colorless green ideas" are and how they are able to "sleep furiously". Chao interprets "colorless" as plain, "green" as unripened, and "sleep furiously" as putting the ideas to rest; sleeping on them overnight whilst having internal conflict with these ideas.

British linguist Angus McIntosh was unable to accept that Chomsky's utterance was entirely meaningless because to him, "colorless green ideas may well sleep furiously". As if to prove that the sentences are in fact meaningful, McIntosh wrote two poems influenced by Chomsky's utterance, one of which was entitled Nightmare I.

Stanford 1985 competition
In 1985, a literary competition was held at Stanford University in which the contestants were invited to make Chomsky's sentence meaningful using not more than 100 words of prose or 14 lines of verse.

An example entry from the competition, by C. M. Street, is:

Experimental usage
Research has been done by implementing this into conversations on text. Research led by Bruno Galantucci at Yeshiva University has implemented the meaningless sentence into real conversations to test reactions. They ran 30 conversations with 1 male and 1 female slipping "colorless green ideas sleep furiously" eight minutes into the conversation during silence. After the conversation, the experimenters did a post-conversation questionnaire, mainly asking if they thought the conversation was unusual. Galantucci concluded that there was a trend of insensitivity to conversational coherence.  

There are two general theories that were garnered from this experiment. The first theory is that people tend to ignore the inconsistency of speech to protect the quality of the conversation. In particular, face-to-face conversation has a 33.33% lower detection rate of nonsensical sentences than online messaging. The authors further explain how humans often disregard some contents of every conversation. The second theory the authors deduced is that effective communication may be subconsciously undermined when dealing with conversational coherence. These conclusions support the idea that phatic communication plays a key role in social life.

Statistical challenges
Since the 1950s, the field has used techniques more in line with Chomsky's approach. However, this all changed in the mid-1980s, when researchers started to experiment with statistical models, convincing over 90% of the researchers in the field to switch to statistical approaches.

In 2000, Fernando Pereira of the University of Pennsylvania fitted a simple statistical Markov model to a body of newspaper text, and showed that under this model, Furiously sleep ideas green colorless is about 200,000 times less probable than Colorless green ideas sleep furiously.

This statistical model defines a similarity metric, whereby sentences which are more like those within a corpus in certain respects are assigned higher values than sentences less alike. Pereira's model assigns an ungrammatical version of the same sentence a lower probability than the syntactically well-formed structure demonstrating that statistical models can identify variations in grammaticality with minimal linguistic assumptions. However, it is not clear that the model assigns every ungrammatical sentence a lower probability than every grammatical sentence. That is, colorless green ideas sleep furiously may still be statistically more "remote" from English than some ungrammatical sentences. To this, it may be argued that no current theory of grammar is capable of distinguishing all grammatical English sentences from ungrammatical ones.

Related and similar examples

In other languages 
The French syntactician Lucien Tesnière came up with the French language sentence "Le silence vertébral indispose la voile licite" ("The vertebral silence indisposes the licit sail").

In Russian schools of linguistics, the glokaya kuzdra example has similar characteristics.

In games 
The game of exquisite corpse is a method for generating nonsense sentences. It was named after the first sentence generated in the game in 1925: Le cadavre exquis boira le vin nouveau (the exquisite corpse will drink the new wine).

In the popular game of "Mad Libs", a chosen player asks each other player to provide parts of speech without providing any contextual information (e.g., "Give me a proper noun", or "Give me an adjective"), and these words are inserted into pre-composed sentences with a correct grammatical structure, but in which certain words have been omitted. The humor of the game is in the generation of sentences which are grammatical but which are meaningless or have absurd or ambiguous meanings (such as 'loud sharks'). The game also tends to generate humorous double entendres.

In philosophy 
There are likely earlier examples of such sentences, possibly from the philosophy of language literature, but not necessarily uncontroversial ones, given that the focus has been mostly on borderline cases. For example, followers of logical positivism hold that "metaphysical" (i.e. not empirically verifiable) statements are simply meaningless; e.g. Rudolf Carnap wrote an article where he argued that almost every sentence from Heidegger was grammatically well-formed, yet meaningless.

The philosopher Bertrand Russell used the sentence "Quadruplicity drinks procrastination" in his "An Inquiry into Meaning and Truth" from 1940, to make a similar point; W.V. Quine took issue with him on the grounds that for a sentence to be false is nothing more than for it not to be true; and since quadruplicity doesn't drink anything, the sentence is simply false, not meaningless.

Other arguably "meaningless" utterances are ones that make sense, are grammatical, but have no reference to the present state of the world, such as Russell's "The present King of France is bald" (France does not presently have a king) from "On Denoting" (also see definite description).

In literature and entertainment 
Another approach is to create a syntactically-well-formed, easily parsable sentence using nonsense words; a famous such example is "The gostak distims the doshes". Lewis Carroll's Jabberwocky is also famous for using this technique, although in this case for literary purposes; similar sentences used in neuroscience experiments are called Jabberwocky sentences.

In a sketch about linguistics, British comedy duo Fry and Laurie used the nonsensical sentence "Hold the newsreader's nose squarely, waiter, or friendly milk will countermand my trousers."

The Star Trek: The Next Generation episode "Darmok" features a race that communicates entirely by referencing folklore and stories. While the vessel's universal translator correctly translates the characters and places from these stories, it fails to decipher the intended meaning, leaving Captain Picard unable to understand the alien.

See also
 List of linguistic example sentences
 Buffalo buffalo Buffalo buffalo buffalo buffalo Buffalo buffalo
 James while John had had had had had had had had had had had a better effect on the teacher
 Pseudoword 
 Syntax‐semantics interface
 Comparative illusion, also known as Escher sentences

Notes

References

Semantics
Syntax
English phrases
Noam Chomsky
Logic
Professional humor
1950s neologisms
Nonsense
Syntax–semantics interface